Timothy John Smith (born 5 October 1947) is a British former Conservative politician.

Politics
In 1977, Smith was selected as Conservative candidate for the Labour seat of Ashfield in Nottinghamshire at the by-election that had been called following the resignation of David Marquand. Ashfield was regarded as a 'safe' Labour seat, but on 28 April, in an amazing result, Smith overturned Marquand's October 1974 majority of 22,915 to win by 264 votes over Labour's Michael Cowan. However, Smith was unable to hold the seat in the 1979 general election.

He was subsequently selected to contest the 1982 Beaconsfield by-election, in which he defeated the Labour candidate, future Prime Minister Tony Blair. Smith was thereafter returned as MP by the constituency at each general election until 1997.

Scandal
During the "cash-for-questions affair" it was revealed that he had taken undeclared payments of between £18,000 and £25,000 from Mohamed Al-Fayed, the owner of Harrods, much of it allegedly handed over in envelopes stuffed with £50 notes. In May 1997, at the subsequent general election, Smith stood down and left politics altogether.

On 3 July 1997, he was found guilty by Sir Gordon Downey of taking cash for questions from Al Fayed, along with Neil Hamilton. The report severely criticised the conduct of both Hamilton and Smith whilst they had been MPs, and said that had they remained MPs they would have faced a substantial suspension from the House of Commons.

Smith now lives in Boyton, Cornwall.

See also 
 1977 Ashfield by-election
 1982 Beaconsfield by-election

References

1947 births
Living people
Conservative Party (UK) MPs for English constituencies
Presidents of the Oxford University Conservative Association
UK MPs 1974–1979
UK MPs 1979–1983
UK MPs 1983–1987
UK MPs 1987–1992
UK MPs 1992–1997
People from Plympton
Northern Ireland Office junior ministers